This is a list of public art in Fort Wayne, Indiana.

This list applies only to works of public art accessible in an outdoor public space. For example, this does not include artwork visible inside a museum.  

Most of the works mentioned are sculptures. When this is not the case (i.e. sound installation, for example) it is stated next to the title.

Fort Wayne

References

Culture of Fort Wayne, Indiana
Tourist attractions in Fort Wayne, Indiana
Fort Wayne, IN Metropolitan Statistical Area
Outdoor sculptures in Indiana
Fort Wayne, Indiana
Fort Wayne, Indiana